Ethusa mascarone is a species of crabs in the family Ethusidae.

Description
The body color is gray-brown, with brown lines on the carapace and transverse striae on the abdomen. Chelipeds and legs are lighter and white speckled.

The front pairs of legs are long, but the hind legs are shorter and are used to carry on the back a variety of objects and organisms, especially valves of bivalves, by which these crabs camouflage and protect themselves. It has been described as a decorator crab despite not belonging to the superfamily Majoidea.

They mainly feed on small organisms and decaying flesh of dead animals.

Distribution
This species is present in the Mediterranean Sea.

Habitat
These crabs live on sandy substrate and muddy bottom, from a few meters up to 75 m deep.

Behavior
Under hypoxic conditions, Ethusa mascarone has been observed to discard its objects of camouflage "to either increase mobility and/or reduce oxygen demand".

References

Türkay, M. (2001). Decapoda, in: Costello, M.J. et al. (Ed.) (2001). European register of marine species: a check-list of the marine species in Europe and a bibliography of guides to their identification. Collection Patrimoines Naturels, 50: pp. 284–292

External links
 Natura Mediterraneo

Crabs
Crustaceans described in 1785